Galão is a hot drink from Portugal made by adding  foamed milk to espresso coffee. Similar to caffè latte or café au lait, it consists of about one quarter coffee and three quarters foamed milk. It is served in a tall glass, as opposed to the smaller garoto that is served in a demitasse. When the proportion is 1:1 it is called meia de leite (half of milk) and it comes in a cup.

See also 
 Bica
 Café com Cheirinho
 Caffè latte
 Cortado
 Garoto
 List of coffee beverages
 Wiener Melange
 for more info on coffee-based drinks see Coffee preparation

References 

 

Coffee drinks
Portuguese drinks